Organ donation rates vary widely by country and region. The tables document the effective organ donor designation rate and deceased donors per million in the United States and abroad.

United States

Global summary

References

External links
EU Facts and Figures. "Key facts and figures on EU organ donation and transplantation", EU Directorate General for Health & Consumers, London, 27 October 2005. Retrieved on 31 March 2012.
Johnson, E. and Goldstein, D. Do defaults save lives?. Science Magazine, 21 November 2003.

Rate
Organ donation